This is a comprehensive listing of official releases by Dmitry Koldun, a Belarusian pop rock singer. Koldun has released four singles and four music videos. Koldun is currently working on his first studio album and has a fan-made compilation album. Koldun rose to fame after his performance in the Eurovision Song Contest 2007 with the song Work Your Magic.

Albums

Other

Singles

Other Singles

Star Factory
The following songs were performed by Koldun during his time as a contestant on the hit Russian TV show Star Factory/Фа́брика звёзд. Some were later available as studio versions.

Eurovision entries
The following songs were Koldun's entries into the Eurovision Song Contest and their variations.

Music videos

DVDs
Koldun currently has two DVDs, one included with the Work Your Magic album. The DVD included with the album features the video to Work Your Magic in both English and Russian. Koldun's other DVD Magic Works in Europe is a documentary that looks at Koldun's life, his tour around Europe prior to the Eurovision Song Contest 2007, rehearsels in Helsinki and the music video to Work Your Magic.

References

Pop music discographies
Discographies of Belarusian artists